The Bill Kenny Show was a Canadian music television series which aired on CBC Television in 1966.

Premise
Bill Kenny, a member of the popular vocal quartet The Ink Spots in the 1930s, 1940s, and 1950s and later a solo singer, hosted this series. He became a Vancouver resident in 1961 and became among the first black performers to star in a nationally broadcast television series in Canada.

Series regulars included singing group The Accents, with Fraser MacPherson's house band. Visiting artists included Susan Pesklevits who was later known as Susan Jacks.

Scheduling
This half-hour series was broadcast on Sundays at 3:00 p.m. (North American Eastern time) from 22 May to 10 July 1966.

References

External links
 

CBC Television original programming
1966 Canadian television series debuts
1966 Canadian television series endings